Feeling Very Strange: The Slipstream Anthology is an anthology of slipstream fiction, edited by James Patrick Kelly and John Kessel, published in 2006 by Tachyon Publications.

Contents
Feeling Very Strange seeks to define the slipstream genre as well as present the foremost examples of it. The editor's foreword consists primarily of attempts to define the genre, and the stories are interspersed with a series of essays and arguments from other authors and commentators, under the heading "I Want My 20th Century Schitzoid Art".

Reception
Feeling Very Strange has received mixed reviews, with most of the negative responses stating that they were unconvinced of the viability of slipstream as a legitimate subgenre. The review on The SF Site was particularly concerned with this element, stating that "stylistic variations among the selections don't help to clarify exactly what slipstream is." A review in Strange Horizons expressed further concern with the definition given, stating that "slipstream is not a genre (and) a slipstream anthology risks seeming arbitrary in its selections. Even if it's a form on its way to becoming a genre, "slipstream" can be seen as an imperialist coinage, a land-grab by the ghetto." It went on to note, however, that "the quality of the stories in this book, with a couple of exceptions...is not in doubt. Publishers Weekly made a similar proviso, stating that "While these intriguing stories (and accompanying essays) may not be enough to define the canon of a new subgenre, they provide plenty of good reading." Susurrus Magazine were less qualified in their praise, stating that "though it's hard to define exactly what is happening, it's a pleasure to read."

References

External links
 Feeling Very Strange on Tachyon Homepage

Science fiction anthologies
Fantasy anthologies
Tachyon Publications books
2006 anthologies